Giovanni Battista Bernero (1736–1796) was an Italian late-Baroque sculptor who worked, mainly in Piedmont, in a formalized restrained style, intermediate between baroque and Neoclassicism.

He was born in Cavallerleone in Piedmont. A royal subsidy provided by Charles Emmanuel III of Savoy enabled him to apprentice with the royal academy of sculpture in Turin under Claudio Francesco Beaumont.

In 1765 he traveled to Rome where he trained under the Piedmontese brothers Ignazio and Filippo Collino. He completed a statue of the Ecstasy of Mary Magdalen in 1770 for the Casale Monferrato Cathedral). He is known for his sculptures of mythological figures associated with hunting for the royal hunting lodge at Stupinigi as well as a stucco relief for Carignano Cathedral, depicting St. Remigius and St. John the Baptist.

Sources

Web Gallery of Art biography

1736 births
1796 deaths
18th-century Italian sculptors
Italian male sculptors
Rococo sculptors
Neoclassical sculptors
Italian Baroque sculptors
18th-century Italian male artists